The Hussaini Encyclopedia (Arabic - دائرة المعارف الحسينية - Dāʾirat al-maʿārif al-Ḥusaynīyah) is a one-of-a-kind encyclopedia in Arabic, completely themed on the third Imam, Husayn ibn Ali, his biography, thought and way of conduct, as well as on the social circle of personalities around him and also of places, chronicles and various other related subjects. This encyclopedia consisted of 700 volumes and well over 95 million words. Sheikh Mohammed Sadiq Al-Karbassi, author of the voluminous Arabic encyclopedia dedicated to Imam al-Hussain started his work by establishing the Hussaini Center for Research in London in 1993. The Hussaini Encyclopedia is a historic study of al-Hussain which provides a heritage owing to its impact on all events, particularly the aftermath of battle of Karbala with its impact being observed in recent times.

About the Hussaini Encyclopedia
In 1987, Al-Karbassi planned to work on the Hussaini Encyclopedia and established the Hussaini Center for Research in London in 1993. The encyclopedia is completely themed on Imam Al-Hussain  His inspiration to start this work was by him who "does not speak out of his own fancy" (The Star 53-3 – i.e. the Islamic prophet Mohammed) when he declared: "Hussain is from me and I am from Hussain". And this work has penetrated the barriers of time, place, language and identity in searching and conveying pieces of information related to the Cause of Imam Al-Hussain.

It covers many different aspects and things which are related to Hussain Ibn Ali, these include: Al-Hussain in the Quran, The Hussaini Biography, Al-Hussain and Legislation, The Dreams, Visions and Interpretations, Glossary of Al-Hussain's Partisans, Glossary of Hashemite Partisans of Al-Hussain, Historical Investigations in the Hussaini uprising, Imam Al-Hussain's Uprising – Emergence and Confirmation of History, Al-Hussain's Life Story, History of the Shrines, 'Ziyara' at Al-Hussaini Shrines, Anthology of the First to Fifteenth Hijra Century poetry, Arabic, Persian, Urdu, Turkish, English, Albanian, Oriental and Occidental Poetry.

The Hussain Encyclopedia is in Arabic but some parts have been translated into different languages such as: English, Persian, Urdu and Pashto. It now consists of over 700 volumes and will over 95 million words, these numbers are expected to continue growing.

This is in principle individual work; however the author has had assistance from people such as researchers, poets, men-of-letters and journalists.

To avoid misunderstanding, the title of the Encyclopedia has been registered in the international languages.

Some of the Hussaini Encyclopedia are available as online books.

The Hussaini Encyclopedia is Available in many Libraries;

Bodleian Libraries of the University of Oxford.

Mar'ashi Najafi library, Qom.

Cambridge University Library.

The National Library of Scotland.

The Library of Trinity College, Dublin.

The National Library of Wales.

About Imam Hussain

Husayn ibn Ali, the grandson of Muhammad and son of Ali & Fatimah; the third Imam of Shia Muslims, who is also known as the Martyr of Martyrs, was killed on Friday, 10th Muharram, 61 Hijri in the Battle of Kerbela, the place is situated at present day Iraq. This day is more commonly known as the Day of Ashura. He was massacred along with some followers, friends, relatives, and his family members by the army of Yazid ibn Mu'awiya, through this promised immolation the faith of Islam was rescued. Yazid's attempt to mold the doctrine of faith and planned to have it endorsed by pledge of allegiance from Hussain Ibn Ali became void by this sacrifice.

Author

The author of The Hussaini Encyclopedia Sheikh Mohammed Sadiq Al-Karbassi was born 20th Oct, 1947 (5th ZilHijjah 1366 in the City of Kerbela, Iraq. He comes from a well-educated family and graduated from established academic institutions of Kerbela, Najaf, Teheran and Qum. Al-Karbassi has lived in Iraq, Iran, Lebanon, and Syria; he now resides in the United Kingdom. Sheikh Al-Karbassi has founded, or took part in founding, some forty institutions and has practiced teaching, authorship, research and imamate, along with practicing the teaching Islamic bodies of knowledge in different cultural metropolitan cities. His work exceeds hundreds, with his work being published in various magazines and articles and his biography has been cited in numerous reference books. His self-fulfilment is in the Hussaini Encyclopedia, work on this commenced on the eve of the eleventh of Muharram, 1408 H, the 5th of September 1987. He has never ceased his work since then.

About The Centre

The Hussaini Centre for Research was established in London in 1993 (1414 H), Sheikh Mohammed Sadiq Mohammed Al-Karbassi used his home as the first base, and foundation for research as his office. There he welcomed politicians and journalists to his home. The centre has relocated to its current location in 2003.
The Hussaini Centre Registered Charity in the UK. No: 1106596, under the title "The Hussaini Charitable Trust".

The centre has a hall for general meetings, with rooms for studying, researching and translating texts. The centre receives many students looking to use its growing private library, which contains over 25,000 titles, specializing on topics of different scholars, with texts and archives in many languages.

The centre stands alone when it comes to holding an entire specialized department containing handwritten and rare documents on different scientific and philosophical topics; the documents in this specialized department hold important historical and scientific value, some being hundreds of years old.

The centre continuously receives awards and nominations, for science and academic studies. The centre has also been the recipient of highly regarded certificates and given the approval of many researchers on science and knowledge. They have visited the centre on countless occasions to dwell upon and answer many questions regarding science and the development of life.

The centre continuously tries to answer the queries of various university students and researchers, using the knowledge of Sheikh Al-Karbassi, and centre's personal library. Many university professors from around the world's universities, notably the UK, Canada, and Germany, have requested their students to study the centre's publications and documents.

The centre has strong relationships and works on many projects regarding science and culture with other global establishments, universities and colleges; including relations with academic professors and lecturers in: Algeria, Australia, Bahrain, Canada, China, Cyprus, France, Iran, Iraq, Italy, Kuwait, Lebanon, Norway, Palestine, Russia, Saudi Arabia, South Africa, Sweden, Switzerland, Syria, Tajikistan, the United Kingdom, the United States of America, and many other countries.

The most notable work of the Hussaini Centre for Research would be the production of The Hussaini Encyclopedia itself, which consists of more than 700 hand written books (drafts) and 105 books published so far. The encyclopedia itself is mainly about Imam Hussain, and anything connected to Imam Hussain is also mentioned and written about in this great encyclopedia.

Structure of The Encyclopedia
The author has observed certain methodical principles in structuring this Encyclopedia which he believes must be adhered to for any desired achievement connected to any work. Below are a few of the things which he followed in producing The Hussaini Encyclopedia:

- In view of facilitation, classification and good order, every section is divided into main chapters, and each chapter is divided into subsections. All materials are headed, numbered and marked which could assist the task of the reader, researcher and critic. For avoiding ambiguity, all texts are marked by phonetic signs when necessary.

- In The Hussaini Encyclopedia each volume is followed by some selected verses from the Quran which give praise to Allah, his Messenger (Mohammed), and his family (Ahlul Bayt). Each volume is also followed by Hadiths narrated from both sects of Islam which relate to the Cause of Imam Al-Hussain.

- Every important chapter or section is coupled with a three-line rhyme-prose supplication that consists of praising The Creator, praying for the Seal of prophets and saying Peace be Upon Him and on his noble family. These lines amount to about a hundred different supplications on a single subject.

- Each chapter or section has an introduction, and each chapter or section ends up with a conclusion where a summary of topics is states. Each volume ends with a concise summary of topics from that volume. These informative conclusions have been worked by scholarly personalities of different ethnic, religious and sectarian identities.

- The information in the Encyclopedia is of reviewed work and comes free of prejudice. It's not set from an assumption and then supporting evidence searched for.

- Anything of uncertainty has been explained in the margins where plenty of space is left for text and commentaries.

List of Printed Volumes

Volumes published so far by the Hussaini Encyclopedia

1. Introduction To Al-Hussaini Poetry - Volume One
2. Introduction To Al-Hussaini Poetry - Volume Two
3. First Century Poetry - Volume One
4. First Century Poetry - Volume Two
5. Second Century Poetry
6. Third Century Poetry
7. Fourth Century Poetry - Volume One
8. Fourth Century Poetry - Volume Two
9. Fifth Century Poetry
10. Sixth Century Poetry
11. Seventh Century Poetry
12. Eighth Century Poetry
13. Ninth Century Poetry
14. Tenth Century Poetry - Volume One
15. Tenth Century Poetry - Volume Two
16. Eleventh Century Poetry - Volume One
17. Eleventh Century Poetry - Volume Two
18. Twelfth Century Poetry - Volume One
19. Twelfth Century Poetry - Volume Two
20. Twelfth Century Poetry - Volume Three
21. Thirteenth Century Poetry - Volume One
22. Thirteenth Century Poetry - Volume Two
23. Thirteenth Century Poetry - Volume Three
24. Thirteenth Century Poetry - Volume Four
25. Thirteenth Century Poetry - Volume Five
26. Thirteenth Century Poetry - Volume Six (NEW)
27. Thirteenth Century Poetry - Volume Seven (NEW)
28. Directory of Poets who composed about Al-Hussain - Volume One
29. Directory of Poets who composed about Al-Hussain - Volume Two
30. Directory of Poets who composed about Al-Hussain - Volume Three
31. Directory of Poets who composed about Al-Hussain - Volume Four
32. Diwan of Al-Mawwal (Az-Zihairi)
33. Al-Abuthiyah Poetry - Volume One
34. Al-Abuthiyah Poetry - Volume Two
35. Al-Abuthiyah Poetry - Volume Three
36. Al-Abuthiyah Poetry - Volume Four
37. Al-Abuthiyah Poetry - Volume Five
38. Al-Abuthiyah Poetry - Volume Six
39. Al-Abuthiyah Poetry - Volume Seven
40. Al-Abuthiyah Poetry - Volume Eight
41. Al-Abuthiyah Poetry - Volume Nine
42. Al-Abuthiyah Poetry - Volume Ten
43. Diwan of "As-Saree"
44. Al-Hussain & Islamic Legislation - Volume One
45. Al-Hussain & Islamic Legislation - Volume Two
46. Al-Hussain & Islamic Legislation - Volume Three
47. Al-Hussain & Islamic Legislation - Volume Four
48. Al-Hussain in the Sunnah (Tradition) - Volume One
49. Introduction to the Urdu poetry
50. Diwan of Urdu Poetry - Volume One
51. Directory of Hussaini Orators - Volume One 
52. Directory of Hussaini Orators - Volume Two
53. Al-Hussain's Biography - Volume One
54. Al-Hussain's Biography - Volume Two
55. The Dreams, Visions and Interpretations - Volume One
56. Hussaini Prayer - Volume One
57. Hussaini Prayer - Volume Two
58. Directory of Books on Al-Hussain - Volume One
59. Directory of Books on Al-Hussain - Volume Two 
60. Directory of Books on Al-Hussain - Volume Three
61. The Political Factor of Al-Hussain's Uprising - Volume One
62. The Generous Hussain in Great Quran - Volume One
63. The Generous Hussain in Great Quran - Volume Two (NEW)
64. The Shrine's History of Al-Hussain - His Family and Partisans - Volume One
65. The Shrine's History of Al-Hussain - His Family and Partisans - Volume Two
65. The Shrine's History of Al-Hussain - His Family and Partisans - Volume Three
66. The Shrine's History of Al-Hussain - His Family and Partisans - Volume Four
67. The Shrine's History of Al-Hussain - His Family and Partisans - Volume Five
68. The Shrine's History of Al-Hussain - His Family and Partisans - Volume Six
69. The Strine's History of Al-Hussain - His Family and Partisans - Volume Seven
70. The Shrine's History of Al-Hussain - His Family and Partisans - Volume Eight
71. The Anthology "Diwan" Imam Al-Hussain - Volume One
72. The Anthology "Diwan" Imam Al-Hussain - Volume Two (NEW)
73. The Anthology "Diwan" Imam Al-Hussain - Volume Three (NEW)
74. Lexicon of Hashemite Partisans of Al-Hussain - Volume One
75. Lexicon of Hashemite Partisans of Al-Hussain - Volume Two
76. Lexicon of Hashemite Partisans of Al-Hussain - Volume Three
77. Lexicon of Women Partisans of Al-Hussain - Volume One
78. Lexicon of Women Partisans of Al-Hussain - Volume Two
79. Lexicon of Women Partisans of Al-Hussain - Volume Three
80. Lexicon of non-Hashemite Partisans of Al-Hussain - Volume One
81. Lexicon of non-Hashemite Partisans of Al-Hussain - Volume Two (NEW)
82. Lexicon of Hussaini Articles - Volume One
83. Lexicon of Hussaini Articles - Volume Two
84. Lexicon of Hussaini Articles - Volume Three
85. Lexicon of Hussaini Articles - Volume Four
86. Lexicon of Hussaini Articles - Volume Five
87. Lexicon of Hussaini Articles - Volume Six 
88. Lexicon of Hussaini Articles - Volume Seven (NEW)
89. Lexicon of Hussaini Articles - Volume Eight (NEW)
90. Lexicon of Hussaini Projects - Volume One
91. Lexicon of Hussaini Projects - Volume Two (NEW)
92. Lights Upon the City of Hussain - Volume One 
93. Introduction to The Persian Poetry - Volume One
94. Introduction to The Persian Poetry - Volume Two
95. Diwan of The Persian Poetry - Volume One 
96. Diwan of Persian Poetry - Volume Two (NEW)
97. Diwan of English Poetry - Volume One 
98. Diwan of AT-Takmees - Volume One 
99. Diwan of AT-Takmees - Volume Two (NEW)
100. Introduction to the Pashto Poetry
101. Diwan of Pashto Poetry - Volume One
102. Said About Al-Hussain - Volume One 
103. Al-Hussain, His Parentage and Descendants - Volume One
104. Al-Hussain, His Parentage and Descendants - Volume Two
105. Al-Hussain, His Parentage and Descendants - Volume Three
106. Al-Hussain, His Parentage and Descendants - Volume Four
107. Al-Hussain in Brief - Volume One (NEW)
108. Al-Hussain in Brief - Volume Two (NEW)

Goals
Below are a list of things The Hussaini Encyclopedia hopes to achieve:

 The Encyclopaedia composed onto compact disks (C.D) and technically registered onto video, DVD and audio cassettes.
 The Encyclopaedia to be translated into international languages; some researchers have already started to translate some volumes.
 To invite scholars to study each of its subjects, some academics have already commenced to do so.
 To found an information centre on Imam Al-Hussain.
 To found a library to contain all writings on Imam Al-Hussain including video tapes.
 To found an institute for Hussaini public speakers for training them to the highest level of internationally recognised academic standards, provided that their degrees will be accepted with international educational institutions; also to found a society for the speakers to protect their interests.
 Production of a motion picture and TV films on the biography of Imam Al-Hussain, his family and partisans on all levels, and the performance of theatrical plays on the Imam and his family and partisans. Also, to start a TV channel or radio station to express the voice of Imam Hussain.
 Convening seminars on the Hussaini Cause for promotion of the Hussaini goals in the field.
 Building a Hussaini society to provide all material and spiritual requirements of life.
 Founding an international centre to administer Hussaini 'waqf' endowments in the world as well as reclaiming hidden ones in orchestration with all Hussaini institutions.
 Founding a centre for preserving the shrines of the Imam and his disciples.
 Publication of a magazine to deal with Hussaini affairs.
 Founding a publishing house to verify and publish Hussaini books.
 To invite scholars and scholarly institutions to prepare and compose similar Encyclopedias for the rest of the fourteen Infallible ones, so that the circle of Islamic heritage to be completed. The author has made an effort with other scholars in this direction.

References

External links
 Hussaini Charitable Trust
 Facebook Page
 Twitter @hussainicentre
 Instagram Page

British online encyclopedias
History books about Islam
Cultural depictions of Husayn ibn Ali
Encyclopedias of Islam